Dave Kendall is a British-born journalist, editor, producer and VJ.  He was first known to the public as the creator and host of MTV's 120 Minutes, an alternative music program that played Sunday nights at midnight from 1986 through the 1990s.

He regularly played the LA club scene as a DJ during these decades and the VJ/DJ mixed the A Voyage into Trance vol. 2 CD album released in 2001. Kendall is attributed co-artist on each track in the list on iTunes, whereas on Amazon, Kendall is listed as the sole author/composer on tracks 2, 3, 4, 6, 7, 9, 10 and other artists for the other tracks.

Since the cancellation of 120 Minutes, he has worked on the internet, creating programs such as The Daily Dish, as a DJ, spinning records at clubs in New York and London, and as a producer at TechTV/G4, Sky, Channel 4, Travel Channel and Animal Planet.

Kendall is now a producer/reporter with the Bangkok Post TV channel, and a host/producer on the travel show Destination Thailand. He also hosts Party 360 with Dave Kendall on the Sirius Satellite Radio channel First Wave on Fridays at 9pm ET and his official Twitter handle is mrdavekendall.

Sources 
Official Homepage

http://www.siriusxm.com/1stwave

Year of birth missing (living people)
Place of birth missing (living people)
Living people
British television journalists
British VJs (media personalities)